Warren Gary Tredrea (born 24 December 1978) is a former Australian Rules Footballer with the Port Adelaide Football Club in the Australian Football League (AFL) and former Weekday Sports Presenter on Nine News Adelaide. Since his retirement from football, he has become a sports media personality featuring on Nine News Adelaide, 3AW, FiveAA and in The Advertiser newspaper.

Tredrea went on to become one of the best forwards in the competition, gaining a long list of individual accolades, including being a premiership winning captain, four Port Adelaide Best and Fairests, eight club Leading Goalkicking awards, an AFL Coaches Association 'Champion Player of the Year' Award, and selection in four All-Australian sides.

Early life 
The son of former Collingwood and Port Adelaide player Gary Tredrea, Warren Tredrea played the bulk of his junior football as a wingman before a substantial growth spurt at the age of 16 saw him transformed into a key position player, highlighted by his capture of both Port's Under-17 Coach's Trophy and the St Michael's College, Adelaide 'student athlete' award in 1995.

Port Adelaide

SANFL debut: 1996 
Tredrea made his senior South Australian National Football League (SANFL) debut for Port Adelaide in 1996, managing nine games and capping his rookie year with a premiership medallion, booting two goals in Port Adelaide's 36-point Grand Final victory over Central District. Tredrea was zone selected for the inaugural Port Adelaide squad in the AFL. Debuting in 1997, he only played one game but went on to be Port Adelaide's leading goal kicker in the following five seasons.

AFL debut: 1997–1999 

As an 18-year-old developing forward Tredrea found his opportunities for senior football limited, with his largely anonymous debut in Round 2 against Essendon being his sole outing for the Power in 1997. During this time Tredrea managed 16 games for 16 goals with Port Adelaide back in the local league, ending his year on a sour note with a steady performance in the Magpies' defeat to Norwood in the 1997 SANFL Grand Final.

After showing glimpses of his ability in the first six rounds of the 1998 AFL season, Tredrea exploded in Round 7 against Carlton at Optus Oval. A simply stunning performance reaped 22 disposals, 17 marks, eight goals (a club record), three Brownlow Medal votes and an AFL Rising Star nomination. His starring role in the 89-point win came at a cost however, with a dislocated kneecap suffered late in the final quarter keeping him out until Round 13. Upon his return to the side Tredrea struggled for consistency but won his first South Australian guernsey with his selection to the State of Origin side to face Western Australia. More impressive performances against Essendon (Round 15, four goals), Melbourne (Round 20, 11 marks, three goals) and Fremantle (Round 21, six goals) followed. He ended the season as leading goalkicker with 33 goals, beating leading goalkicker of 1997, Scott Cummings by a goal.

He finished the following season in 1999, on 40 goals as leading goalkicker again. Where Port Adelaide made the finals for the first time in their AFL history.

Premier competition player: 2000–2003 
After finishing 14th at the end of the 2000 season, he led the goalkicking for the third year in a row, with 32 goals. In 2001, Tredrea imposed himself on the AFL competition, booting 51 goals and taking 169 marks with his contributions as a major factor in his side's rise from 14th to third on the AFL ladder. Tredrea was rewarded for his season winning his maiden John Cahill Medal as Port Adelaide's best and fairest player and the first of four selections as All-Australian centre half forward. Tredrea backed up his breakthrough 2001 efforts with further outstanding seasons in 2002, by kicking 49 goals (just missing out on being the leading goal kicking by three goals behind Stuart Dew) with an All-Australian selection and in 2003, he booted 58 goals, being the leading goal kicker for the club a fifth time and getting another All-Australian.

Career high: 2004–2005 
The 2004 season is considered Tredrea's best year as he led Port Adelaide to its first AFL premiership in the absence of the injured captain Matthew Primus. He started the year in fine fashion, kicking six goals alongside Stuart Dew in the club's 96-point victory over Essendon. He then kicked five goals against West Coast the following week and booted four goals against Hawthorn in Round 3. He gained captaincy for the entire year after Primus re-injured his knee in Round 3. He had a season-high seven goals in Round 7 in the showdown against Adelaide. He went on to kick six goals against Carlton in Round 15 and against West Coast in Round 17. He then captained the team into the finals and eventually captained them to the premiership win over the Brisbane Lions. He booted 81 goals (career best) and took 192 marks playing in all 25 of the Power's games for the season as well as reaping a host of awards, including his fourth All-Australian centre half forward guernsey, the All-Australian vice-captaincy, his second John Cahill Medal as Port's Best and Fairest player, the AFL Coaches' Association Most Valuable Player award, the Showdown Medal, a raft of media awards and was the pre-count favourite for the Brownlow Medal, only to poll a disappointing 15 votes behind the eventual winner, Chris Judd, who admitted in his acceptance speech "I thought Warren Tredrea was a shoo-in to be honest".

At the beginning of the 2005 season, he kicked five goals in a two-point win in the grand final rematch against the Brisbane Lions and again kicked five goals in Round 5 in the four-point loss against Geelong. In Round 7 there was a controversy after a celebration in Port Adelaide's 47-point victory over the Kangaroos, when after kicking one of his six goals in a best-on-ground performance, he put his hand to his ear in a demonstrative "phonecall" celebration. Tredrea stated that as an Arsenal fan, the celebration was an homage to Thierry Henry who had "then" recently celebrated in the same fashion. In Round 13, he kicked seven goals against Hawthorn in Port Adelaide's biggest victory, earning him three Brownlow votes. In what was a dismal premiership defence whereby Port barely scraped into the finals series in eighth place before bowing out at the Semi Final stage to crosstown rivals Adelaide. Tredrea repeated what he did the previous year, booting 65 goals and taking a personal best 220 marks to win his third John Cahill Medal despite narrowly losing his All-Australian mantle to Fremantle's Matthew Pavlich. Indeed, Tredrea played some of his most explosive football ever highlighted by a dominant seven-goal haul on the All-Australian centre half back, Trent Croad, a pair of five-goal hauls on Matthew Scarlett of Geelong and Mal Michael of Brisbane; and a best on ground performance against the Kangaroos in the Elimination Final after kicking four goals.

Decline: 2006–2008 
With the retirement of Primus at the end of 2005, Tredrea took over the captaincy role full-time for the 2006 season but like his predecessor, was struck down by a serious knee injury, suffering a dislocated left kneecap in a preseason game against the Brisbane Lions. Upon his return to the side in Round 4 kicking only two goals against the Saints, it was clear Tredrea was still being hampered by the knee and with the notable exception of his four-goal game against Essendon in Round 9 and the 16 mark and three goal game against Hawthorn in Round 11, his overall performances were mediocre by his usual lofty standards. When it became obvious in Round 15 after only kicking one goal against Geelong and with the Power looking like not making the finals, Tredrea had surgery on his knee early with the intention of having him fully fit before 2007.

Despite undergoing knee surgery in August 2006, Tredrea's recovery was a slow one, robbing him of vital preseason training, "I started running (after knee surgery) at Christmas, my team-mates were breaking personal bests in 3 km time trials and I wasn't even running," he said. Tredrea finally made his long-awaited return to competitive football with a seven-goal performance for the Port Adelaide in the SANFL in April, however his inconsistent form since returning to the Power was the source of much conjecture and speculation.

In Round 12 2007, Tredrea played his 200th senior appearance for the club against the team he first played against, Essendon and in doing so became the first Port player to reach that milestone in the club's AFL era. Prior to the occasion Port Adelaide coach Mark Williams declared, "Tredders will go down in history, certainly in his first 200 games anyway, as the best player that's ever played for the club". In an auspicious return to form Tredrea booted four goals in the Power's 31-point victory over Essendon at AAMI Stadium. In Round 16, after kicking three goals against Richmond he bruised his bone and ended up missing a month of football before returning in Round 20 against Hawthorn in Tasmania. In the Qualifying Final against West Coast, he helped Port win the game with an excellent check side goal and a Shepherd to give them the three-point win.

In the 2007 Grand Final Tredrea was one of Port's few good players, kicking two goals in Port Adelaide's record Grand Final defeat to Geelong.  In December 2007, after much speculation, Tredrea re-signed with the Power for a further year. After speculation he would not be reappointed due to lingering doubts over his durability and longevity, Tredrea was reappointed as club captain for 2008 after impressive pre-season form.

He captained the team again in 2008, kicking two goals in Port's Grand Final rematch against Geelong and again the following week. He booted four goals against Hawthorn in Round 8 (three goals in the first quarter) and again kicked four goals against Fremantle in Round 17, eventually dislocating his shoulder in the final term, ending his year. Despite criticism and queries over his form for the bulk of the year, Tredrea performed admirably in season 2008, kicking 31 goals and registering 28 score assists in 17 games.

Late career and retirement: 2009–2010 

Tredrea started the first two games of 2009 slowly but in Round 3 he kicked six goals against the Demons. The first time he had kicked five or more goals since Round 15, 2005. The next week he kicked his 500th goal and kicked another six goals against the Hawks before kicking seven goals against Richmond in Round 8, including the match winning goal with less than a minute to play and a towering mark at the other end of the ground to secure the game with seconds to play. After the match Mark Williams claimed it was his best game he had ever played earning him three Brownlow votes. He booted three goals in the Geelong loss in Round 13 and kicked four goals against the Brisbane Lions in Round 21, which was his final game for the year. Tredrea booted 51 goals in 21 games of the season, his best return since 2005 and the eighth time he had topped the Port Adelaide goal kicking chart. At season's end Tredrea was awarded his fourth John Cahill Medal as Port Adelaide's best and fairest player.

At the start of 2010, he became the last inaugural player for the club who played with the Power (Nathan Eagleton was also the only other inaugural Port Adelaide player still competing in the league, although he was playing for the Western Bulldogs until his retirement at the end of the 2010 season). Tredrea started 2010 well, kicking two goals and picking up 13 disposals against North Melbourne at AAMI Stadium. Tredrea played his 250th game with a win against the West Coast Eagles in Round 2 at Subiaco Oval. In the week leading up to Tredrea's 250th game, when asked if he wanted to continue playing football further than 2010 he replied stating, "You never want to put a timeline on things, but mentally I prepared as though last year would be the end. I wanted to make every post a winner and do everything I could to give myself the best opportunity (to perform) and it went on a year longer than I thought it would. If the body's fresh, my form is good and I'm enjoying it then there's no reason why I won't continue."

However, in Round 7, 2010, Tredrea collided with teammate Matt Thomas and damaged his ankle ligaments. On 26 July 2010, as a result of the injury, Tredrea retired, having played 255 games with a return of 549 goals. He is considered by many to be the greatest Port Adelaide player of its AFL era. He was farewelled with a lap of honour in Port Adelaide's Round 18 win over Hawthorn and a testimonial dinner on 5 November 2010.

Media career 
Tredrea presented the Weekday Sports Bulletin until December 2021 due to Nine Network's COVID-19 double vaccination policy for Nine News Adelaide, performs the "Expert Special Comments Role" as part of 3AW's National AFL Broadcast. He also writes a weekly sports column for the Advertiser and has just left TripleM to join the FIVEaa sports team.  He will be joining Rowie and Bicks on their afternoon sports show weekly and also give special comments at games during the football season.

Personal life 
Warren Tredrea has three children: a daughter, Halle Neve, born in September 2007, and two sons, Nate Callum born in March 2009 and Leo Mason born in October 2010. In June 2019 he married Bianca Potuszynski. He is a fan of Premier League club Arsenal.

Playing statistics

|-
|- style="background-color: #EAEAEA"
! scope="row" style="text-align:center" | 1997
|style="text-align:center;"|
| 16 || 1 || 0 || 0 || 2 || 2 || 4 || 0 || 1 || 0.0 || 0.0 || 2.0 || 2.0 || 4.0 || 0.0 || 1.0
|-
! scope="row" style="text-align:center" | 1998
|style="text-align:center;"|
| 16 || 17 || 33 || 18 || 118 || 57 || 175 || 67 || 17 || 1.9 || 1.1 || 6.9 || 3.4 || 10.3 || 3.9 || 1.0
|- style="background-color: #EAEAEA"
! scope="row" style="text-align:center" | 1999
|style="text-align:center;"|
| 16 || 20 || 40 || 30 || 190 || 105 || 295 || 133 || 17 || 2.0 || 1.5 || 9.5 || 5.3 || 14.8 || 6.7 || 0.9
|-
! scope="row" style="text-align:center" | 2000
|style="text-align:center;"|Port Adelaide
| 16 || 21 || 32 || 35 || 186 || 96 || 282 || 120 || 35 || 1.5 || 1.7 || 8.9 || 4.6 || 13.4 || 5.7 || 1.7
|- style="background-color: #EAEAEA"
! scope="row" style="text-align:center" | 2001
|style="text-align:center;"|
| 16 || 23 || 51 || 36 || 277 || 98 || 375 || 169 || 33 || 2.2 || 1.6 || 12.0 || 4.3 || 16.3 || 7.3 || 1.4
|-
! scope="row" style="text-align:center" | 2002
|style="text-align:center;"|
| 16 || 25 || 49 || 41 || 298 || 102 || 400 || 195 || 37 || 2.0 || 1.6 || 11.9 || 4.1 || 16.0 || 7.8 || 1.5
|- style="background-color: #EAEAEA"
! scope="row" style="text-align:center" | 2003
|style="text-align:center;"|
| 16 || 23 || 58 || 36 || 256 || 130 || 386 || 198 || 30 || 2.5 || 1.6 || 11.1 || 5.7 || 16.8 || 8.6 || 1.3
|-
! scope="row" style="text-align:center;" | 2004
|style="text-align:center;"|
| 16 || 25 || 81 || 44 || 286 || 105 || 391 || 192 || 30 || 3.2 || 1.8 || 11.4 || 4.2 || 15.6 || 7.7 || 1.2
|- style="background-color: #EAEAEA"
! scope="row" style="text-align:center" | 2005
|style="text-align:center;"|
| 16 || 24 || 65 || 45 || 307 || 88 || 395 || 220 || 33 || 2.7 || 1.9 || 12.8 || 3.7 || 16.5 || 9.2 || 1.4
|-
! scope="row" style="text-align:center" | 2006
|style="text-align:center;"|
| 1 || 11 || 17 || 8 || 99 || 39 || 138 || 75 || 20 || 1.5 || 0.7 || 9.0 || 3.5 || 12.5 || 6.8 || 1.8
|- style="background-color: #EAEAEA"
! scope="row" style="text-align:center" | 2007
|style="text-align:center;"|
| 1 || 20 || 31 || 21 || 151 || 61 || 212 || 104 || 34 || 1.6 || 1.1 || 7.6 || 3.1 || 10.6 || 5.2 || 1.7
|-
! scope="row" style="text-align:center" | 2008
|style="text-align:center;"|
| 1 || 17 || 31 || 19 || 155 || 71 || 226 || 105 || 25 || 1.8 || 1.1 || 9.1 || 4.2 || 13.3 || 6.2 || 1.5
|- style="background-color: #EAEAEA"
! scope="row" style="text-align:center" | 2009
|style="text-align:center;"|
| 16 || 21 || 51 || 27 || 188 || 91 || 279 || 143 || 33 || 2.4 || 1.3 || 9.0 || 4.3 || 13.3 || 6.8 || 1.6
|-
! scope="row" style="text-align:center" | 2010
|style="text-align:center;"|
| 16 || 7 || 10 || 2 || 51 || 28 || 79 || 30 || 8 || 1.4 || 0.3 || 7.3 || 4.0 || 11.3 || 4.3 || 1.1
|- class="sortbottom"
! colspan=3| Career
! 255
! 549
! 362
! 2564
! 1073
! 3637
! 1751
! 353
! 2.2
! 1.4
! 10.1
! 4.2
! 14.3
! 6.9
! 1.4
|}

Honours and achievements

Team:
 AFL Premiership (Port Adelaide): 2004
 AFL McClelland Trophy (Port Adelaide): 2002, 2003, 2004
 AFL Wizard Cup (Port Adelaide): 2002
 SANFL Premiership (Port Adelaide): 1996

Individual:

 All-Australian: 2001, 2002, 2003, 2004 (vice-captain)
 AFL Norwich Rising Star Nomination: 1998
 AFL Coaches Association 'Champion Player of the Year' Award: 2004
 AFL Players Association 'Champion Player of the Year' Award: 2003 (3rd place), 2004 (3rd place)
 John Cahill Medal: 2001, 2004, 2005, 2009
 John Cahill Medal 'Runner-Up': 1999, 2002, 2003
 Port Adelaide F.C. Captain: 2004, 2006–2008
 Port Adelaide F.C. Life Membership: 2005 induction
 Port Adelaide F.C. Leading Club Goalkicker award: 1998, 1999, 2000, 2001, 2003, 2004, 2005, 2009
 Port Adelaide F.C. Most career AFL goals: 549
 Port Adelaide F.C. Most goals in an AFL game: 8 (Round 7, 1998)
 Port Adelaide F.C. Most Improved Player award: 1998, 1999
 Herald Sun Player of the Year Award: 2004
 3AW Player of the Year Award: 2004
 The Advertiser Player of the Year: Award 2004
 Triple M Player of the Year Award: 2004
 The Age Player of the Year Award: 2004
 West End Showdown Medal XVI: 2004
Peter Badcoe VC Medal 2005 round 5
 SANFL Hall of Fame Inductee 2012
Australian Football Hall of Fame Inductee 2014

Milestones:
 AFL debut: Round 2, 1997 (vs. ) at Football Park (Port Adelaide lost by 33 points)
 Finals debut: Qualifying final, 1999 (vs. ) at the MCG (Port Adelaide lost by 44 points)
 50th game: Round 13, 2000 (vs. ) at Football Park (Port Adelaide won by 14 points)
 100th game: Round 18, 2002 (vs. ) at the Football Park (Port Adelaide won by 42 points)
 150th game: Round 20, 2004 (vs. ) at Marrara Oval (Port Adelaide won by 86 points)
 200th game: Round 12, 2007 (vs. ) at the AAMI stadium (Port Adelaide won by 31 points)
 250th game: Round 2, 2010 (vs. ) at the Subiaco Oval (Port Adelaide won by 3 points)
 Final game: Round 7, 2010 (vs. ) at Etihad Stadium (Port Adelaide won by 3 points)

References
Notes

External links 

1978 births
Living people
Australian rules footballers from South Australia
South Australian State of Origin players
Port Adelaide Football Club players
Port Adelaide Football Club Premiership players
Port Adelaide Football Club (SANFL) players
Port Adelaide Football Club players (all competitions)
Port Adelaide Magpies players
John Cahill Medal winners
All-Australians (AFL)
Australian Football Hall of Fame inductees
South Australian Football Hall of Fame inductees
Journalists from South Australia
Australia international rules football team players
One-time VFL/AFL Premiership players